Bittman John "Bimbo" Rivas (November 11, 1939 – May 21, 1992) was a Puerto Rican actor, community activist, director, playwright, poet, and teacher who lived in the Lower East Side of New York City. He also served in the U.S. Air Force. He was one of the pioneers of the Nuyorican Movement and was involved in the Nuyorican Poets Café.

Life
Bittman (Bimbo) Rivas got his nickname because of his birth name Bittman. He was teased as a child and called Bimbo, instead of Bittman. He later, as a teenager saw a movie where an elephant named Bimbo was loved and respected. At that moment he had decided to empower the  name and made it his own. The name lasted, as he was from that point on known to everyone as Bimbo Rivas. Bimbo Rivas was much more down to earth and his journey led him to NYC's Lower East Side where he spent the rest of his life.

In the Lower East Side, Bimbo found affordable housing, in one of the top locations in New York and in the 1970s moved there with his family.  He soon noticed the place was in a continual stage of deterioration, not just because of the crumbling and empty buildings around him, but also due to the declining morale of its people.   Some faced horrible living conditions, with people squatting in buildings and others warming up by 55 gallons on the sidewalk or empty lots. Yet others were being swept into or by the crime wave prevalent in most of New York in those days.

From his experiences, Bimbo was moved to write the "Loisaida" poem that today gives the Lower East Side its nickname.   Bimbo also recognized an opportunity to turn things around and improve quality of life for Loisaida's residents, whom he considered his family whether by blood or association.  He tackled the quality of life issue by reconciling the needs of the residents with available government programs to improve communities.

He helped people that had lived in buildings for years finally get a title to their property, and guided others to work with authorities to force landlords to maintain their properties and make them livable so they could collect their rents and the residents had better apartments they could feel proud of.  These and other activities helped give momentum to a tremendous transformation of the Lower East Side that by the turn of the 20th century, had turned "Loisaida", into the tree-lined, bohemian, and ultra-chic East Village.

On May 21, 1992, while substitute teaching a kindergarten class he suffered a heart attack in the classroom and soon after died. He was 52 years old, and left behind his 6 children.

Legacy
Bimbo Rivas was a community activist, who gave the Lower East Side the name "Loisaida" in a 1974 poem. He was a committed artist, whose talent enriched not only the Puerto Rican culture, but other cultures as well. Bimbo's spirit and influence lives on in Loisaida today.

Among his students was the actor Luis Guzmán, who was trained at Charas/El Bohio in New York City.

On May 27, 1992, Avenue C became known as Loisaida Avenue. Rivas was the first to coin the name "Loisaida" and used it in a poem.

Affiliations
The Puerto Rican Traveling Theatre Co., Inc. New York, NY.
The Lower East Side People’s Federal Credit Union, Loisaida, NYC, NY.
Adopt-A-Building Inc, Loisaida, NYC, NY.
El Bohio Cultural & Community Center, Loisaida, NYC, NY.
The Public Theater, New York, NY US.
El Teatro Ambulante—El Coco que Habla, Loisaida, NYC, NY.
Nuyorican Poets Café, Loisaida, NYC, NY.

References

Further reading 

Council on Museums and Education in the Visual Arts. "Community-Based Museums and Umbrella Agencies." The Art Museum as Educator: A Collection of Studies as Guides to Practice. Berkeley: University of California Press, 1978.
Hernández, Carmen Dolores. "Pedro Pietri." Puerto Rican Voices in English: Interviews with Writers. Westport: Praeger, 1997. 
Sevcenko, Liz. "Making Loisaida: Placing Puertorriqueñidad in Lower Manhattan." In Agustín Laó-Montes and Arlene M. Dávila, eds. Mambo Montage: The Latinization of New York. New York: Columbia University Press, 2001. 
On Broadway, May 23, 1974 played the role of Juan Otero “Original” for the play by Miguel Pinero “Short Eyes” from the PlayBill website 

1939 births
1992 deaths
American people of Puerto Rican descent